Bruce Mars (born October 23, 1935), also known as Brother Paramananda, is a monk of the Self-Realization Fellowship in Los Angeles, California, and a former actor.

Acting career
After working on some off-Broadway productions in New York City, Mars moved to Los Angeles to pursue his acting career. He gained a guest role on Rawhide, where he met casting director Joe D'Agosta. Mars later contacted D'Agosta after the casting director moved on to work on Star Trek, and was brought in to audition for the role of Junior Navigations Officer Dave Bailey in episode "The Corbomite Maneuver", alongside five other actors. Anthony Call was cast instead, but Mars also appeared in the background as Crewman #1. D'Agosta kept Mars in mind for a bigger part, and when casting was underway for "Shore Leave", he suggested to Mars that he should come in for a further audition for the part of Finnegan. Mars later said he felt like he had "nailed this baby" and was offered the role in person. Based on the success of this, he was brought back for a third occasion to play a 20th-century police officer in the episode "Assignment: Earth".

Outside of Star Trek, he appeared in the Voyage to the Bottom of the Sea episodes "Killers of the Deep" and "The Abominable Snowman".

Religious career
Mars quit the acting profession to become a monk with the Self-Realization Fellowship in Los Angeles and eventually took the name Brother Paramananda. He said in an interview with the Los Angeles Times in 2004 about his spiritual awakening, "The words 'karma' and 'reincarnation' are being thrown around everywhere, even in sports - at some TV basketball game, a guy tried a shot and couldn't make it, and the radio announcer said it was his karma. I went the whole hog and became a monk and walked away. Nowadays people don't have to run away to meditate. There are doctors, lawyers, a mother with three children - anyone can do it. There's more acceptance." During his time at the Fellowship, he conversed with Elvis Presley on several occasions, who on one occasion said to Paramananda, "Man, you made the right choice. People don't know my life or that I sometimes cry myself to sleep because I don't know God."

Filmography

Notes

References

External links 
 

1935 births
20th-century American male actors
20th-century monks
American monks
American yogis
Devotees of Paramahansa Yogananda
Kriya yogis
Living people